Carl Groos Jockusch Jr. (born July 13, 1941, in San Antonio, Texas) is an American mathematician. He graduated from Alamo Heights High School in 1959, attended Vanderbilt University in Nashville, Tennessee, and transferred to Swarthmore College, Pennsylvania in 1960, where he received his B.A. in 1963 with Highest Honors. He then enrolled at the Massachusetts Institute of Technology. He is a member of Phi Beta Kappa and Sigma Xi. In 2014, he became a Fellow of the American Mathematical Society. He is a professor emeritus at the University of Illinois at Urbana–Champaign.

In 1972 Jockusch and Robert I. Soare proved the low basis theorem, an important result in mathematical logic with applications to recursion theory and reverse mathematics.

See also
Jockusch–Soare forcing
Semi-membership

References

External links 
 Professional homepage
 

20th-century American mathematicians
21st-century American mathematicians
University of Illinois Urbana-Champaign faculty
Living people
Place of birth missing (living people)
1941 births
Fellows of the American Mathematical Society
Massachusetts Institute of Technology alumni
Swarthmore College alumni
Vanderbilt University alumni